The Mapleton-Minto 81's are a senior hockey team based out of Palmerston, Harriston, and Drayton, Ontario, Canada.  They play in the Western Ontario Athletic Association Senior Hockey League.

Championships
Palmerston won the WOAA Grand Championship in the 1957-58 season.  The current Palmerston 81's have three WOAA Sr. "A" Championships, in 1998-99, 2005–06, and 2007–08, and they have a WOAA Sr. "AA" Championship, in 2002-03.

2006-07 Season
Palmerston, the defending Senior "A" Champions, had a very strong year, with a 17-7-0 record, good for fourth in the North Division.

The 81's would face the South Division champions, the Clinton Radars in the "AA" quarter-finals.  After falling behind by losing the first game of the series, Palmerston would win two in a row in overtime to take a 2-1 series lead.  Clinton would come back and win two in a row to put Palmerston behind 3-2, however in the sixth game, the 81's staved off elimination with a convincing 5-2 victory, forcing a seventh game in Clinton.  The 81's would fall behind the Radars 3-0 after the first period and could never recover, losing 6-2 and being eliminated from the playoffs.

2007-08 Season
After starting the season off with a 7-2-1 record in their first 10 games, the 81's would slump, losing six of their next eight games, to sit with a 9-8-1 record, and push the team out of the "AA" playoff picture.  Palmerston snapped out of their slump, and in their remaining eight games, they posted an impressive 7-0-1 record, and finish in fifth place in the North Division, and qualifying for the "A" playoffs.

The 81's opening opponent in the quarter-finals was the Monkton Wildcats, and Monkton surprised Palmerston with a 4-3 OT victory in the series opener, followed by a 2-1 win in the second game to take a 2-0 series lead.  The 81's fought back, winning games three and four to tie the series, but the Wildcats put Palmerston on the brink of elimination with a 4-0 victory in the fifth game to take a 3-2 series lead.  The 81's would once again fight back, hanging on for a 4-3 win in the sixth game, sending the series to a seventh and deciding game.  Palmerston would complete the comeback, defeating Monkton 5-4, and advance to the "A" semi-finals.

Palmerston would face the defending "A" champions, the Durham Thundercats in the semi-finals, and the 81's would win a very wild opening game by a score of 9-7.  Durham rebounded to tie the series up in the second game, however, Palmerston would dominate the Thundercats in the third game, winning 10-5, and taking a 2-1 series lead.  Palmerston's offense stayed hot, defeating Durham 7-3 in the fourth game, and then defeating the Thundercats in the fifth game by a 7-4 score to win the series, advancing to the "A" finals.

The 81's next opponent would be the Lucknow Lancers, and after dropping the series opener by a 5-4 score, Palmerston would win the next two games by scores of 6-4 and 7-1 to take a 2-1 series lead.  Lucknow evened the series with a 7-5 victory in the fourth game, however, Palmerston once again took the series lead with a solid 7-3 win in the fifth game.  The 81's would hang on for a 3-2 win in the sixth game, winning the "A" championship for the second time in three seasons.

2008-09 Season
Palmerston would get off to a hot start to begin the regular season, winning their first seven games.  The 81's would continue to play good hockey throughout the regular season, finishing off with a 14-4-2 record, earning 30 points, and fourth in the WOAA North Division.

Palmerston opened the playoffs against the Durham Thundercats, with the winner advancing to the "AA" quarter-finals.  The 81's opened the series with a 9-2 victory, followed by a 6-2 win the second game to take a 2-0 series lead.  The third game would be determined in overtime, as the scored was tied 4-4 after three periods of play, and it would be Palmerston earning the victory to take the 3-0 series lead.  The fourth game would once again be tied 4-4 after regulation time, and the 81's would earn the series sweep, by scoring in the extra period and advance to the "AA" quarter-finals.

In the "AA" quarter-finals, the 81's faced off against the Saugeen Shores Winterhawks, where Saugeen Shores would take an early series lead by defeating Palmerston 5-3 in the series opener, followed by a 7-6 Winterhawks victory in the second game.  Saugeen Shores would continue their winning ways in the third game, defeating the 81's 6-4 to take a 3-0 series lead.  Palmerston would fight off elimination in the fourth game, defeating the Winterhawks 8-5, however, Saugeen Shores would end the 81's season in the fifth game with a 4-2 victory over Palmerston.

2009-10 Season
Palmerston would struggle during the 2009-10 season, as they finished with a record of 8-9-3, earning 19 points, and a seventh-place finish in the North Division standings.

In the playoffs, the 81's faced off against the Shelburne Muskies in a best of five qualifying round.  The Muskies easily defeated the 81's by a 6-3 score in the series opener, followed by a 5-2 Shelburne win in the second game.  Palmerston kept the third game close, however, Shelburne completed the three game sweep with a 4-3 win, sending Palmerston to the "A" playoffs.

In the "A" quarter-finals, the 81's would face the Lucknow Lancers.  Lucknow took the first game, winning a wild one by a score of 8-6.  The Lancers then took the second game by a 7-3 score, followed by a 7-4 Lucknow win in the third game as the Lancers took a 3-0 series lead.  Lucknow completed the sweep in the fourth game, blowing out Palmerston 9-3 to end the 81's season.

2010-11 Season
After a very disappointing 2009-10 season, the 81's improved a little bit during the season, as the club went 13-12-1 to finish above the .500 mark, earning 27 points, and finishing in fifth place in the North Division standings.  In the summer of 2011, the team announced they were merging with the Drayton Icemen and expanding their territory with it.  They are now called the Mapleton-Minto 81's.

2011-12 Season
The 81's were able to maintain their 5th place spot in the North Division following the merger with Drayton, finishing the 24-game schedule with a record of 11-10-3.

They faced off against the Durham Thundercats in a North Division quarterfinal series, falling in 5 games.

2012-13 Season
The 81's started off their season with promise, defeating the defending champion Saugeen Shores Winterhawks in the Winterhawks home opener. The 81's were unable to sustain the success, and struggled to a record of 7-15-2. They finished 7th in the North Division, ahead of only the last-place Lucknow Lancers.

After falling to the 2nd-seed Winterhawks in the first round of the "AA" playoffs, the 81's withdrew from the "A" championship playoffs.

2013-14 Season
After a strong regular season, the 81's reached their first league final since 2002 by sweeping the Elora Rocks in four games in the North Division final.

Season-by-Season record
Note: GP = Games played, W = Wins, L = Losses, T= Tie, OTL = Overtime Losses, Pts = Points, GF = Goals for, GA = Goals against

More information will be added as more becomes available

Related links
Palmerston, Ontario
Western Ontario Athletic Association
WOAA Senior Hockey League

External links
WOAA Website
WOAA Senior Hockey Website
Palmerston 81's Website

Senior ice hockey teams
Ice hockey teams in Ontario